Stylosiphonia is a monotypic genus of flowering plants belonging to the family Rubiaceae. The only species is Stylosiphonia glabra.

Its native range is Southeastern Mexico.

References

Rubiaceae
Monotypic Rubiaceae genera